The Display pixel interface (DPI) is the interface defined by the Mobile Industry Processor Interface (MIPI), which is used for Active-Matrix LCD displays for handheld devices.  It is intended for the display modules in the mobile devices.

References

Interfaces
MIPI Alliance standards
Communication interfaces